Gilles Moreau (born 2 May 1945) is a French former freestyle swimmer. He competed in the men's 200 metre freestyle at the 1968 Summer Olympics.

References

External links
 

1945 births
Living people
French male freestyle swimmers
Olympic swimmers of France
Swimmers at the 1968 Summer Olympics
Sportspeople from Loire-Atlantique